Huites Dam, officially known as Luis Donaldo Colosio Dam, is located on the Rio Fuerte in northwestern Sinaloa, Mexico  northeast of Los Mochis. The -high, hybrid concrete arch-gravity dam impounds a reservoir called Lago Huites or Presa Luís Donaldo Colosio and is owned by the Comisión Federal de Electricidad.

The construction of a dam on the upper Rio Fuerte was considered since the 1940s but the first detailed studies were not made until 1974–1977. Construction started in 1992 with the excavation of a diversion channel around the dam site and the implementation of a pair of cofferdams to protect the site from floods. About  of material was excavated from the site before construction on the actual dam could begin. Construction was completed in 1995 at a cost of roughly US$ 212 million. The dam's two generators were commissioned on 15 September 1996.

About  are given exclusively for flood control. Floodwaters are released through a spillway on the south side of the dam, controlled by four  radial gates. The dam's power plant has two Francis turbines with a combined generating capacity of 422 megawatts (MW) and produces an average of 875 million KWh annually.

See also

List of power stations in Mexico
List of tallest dams in the world

Notes and references

Dams in Mexico
Gravity dams
Hydroelectric power stations in Mexico
Dams completed in 1995